The David Nott Foundation is a foundation aimed at assisting with training of surgeons for areas of conflict. The charity was set up by Welsh "war surgeon" David Nott.

Founding 
On a mission to Libya, general and vascular surgeon David Nott began to realise that a lot of the medical staff there were not trained for the kinds of injuries they were encountering. He began running a Definitive Surgical Trauma Skills workshop for his colleagues in the hospital. This experience, in part, led to Nott setting up the David Nott Foundation in 2015, along with his wife Elly, who led the charity as Chief Executive until 2019.

Training 
The David Nott Foundation provides surgical training for doctors and nurses who work in war and disaster zones. The training courses focus on life saving surgical procedures that are crucial in austere environments, with doctors given the opportunity to practice on real bodies, supported by other resources, including videos and anatomical models. The courses are run with the Royal College of Surgeons for five days every six months and are fully funded by the foundation through a scholarship scheme for surgeons working in hostile conditions.

These courses are also delivered on the front line, where doctors are unable to leave their posts, and have already been held in Yemen, Libya and Iraq, among others. The front line Hostile Environment Surgical Training courses (HEST) last for four days. They focus on a wide range of skills, including treating gun shot wounds and carrying out vascular surgery, with the help of a full-body simulator. The simulator is a perfectly accurate model of the human body and can be used to demonstrate various procedures.

More recently, the foundation has provided surgical training for areas of conflict in Ukraine, during the Russo-Ukrainian War.

References 

Charity
British charity and campaign group workers